Sergei Viktorovich Medvedev (born 27 April 1973) is a former Russian football player.

Club career
He made his Russian Premier League debut for FC Asmaral Moscow on 13 March 1993 in a game against FC Zhemchuzhina Sochi.

In September 1998, he came to a friend's wedding in Ingushetia. On the eighth day of the festivities, two cars flew up to Medvedev and took him prisoner to Chechnya. He stayed in captivity for 335 days and was released on August 30, 1998, thanks to his friend and former teammate Sergei Grishin, who ask to the Minister of Internal Affairs Sergei Stepashin.

References

1973 births
Living people
Russian footballers
FC Asmaral Moscow players
Russian Premier League players
FC Luch Vladivostok players
Association football defenders